Willie Bera (born 10 August 1964) is a Papua New Guinean former footballer who played as a goalkeeper.

International career
He won six caps for the Papua New Guinea national football team between 1996 and 1997.

External links

1964 births
Living people
Papua New Guinean footballers
Papua New Guinea international footballers
Association football goalkeepers